The Athena Promachos ("Athena who fights in the front line") was a colossal bronze statue of Athena sculpted by Pheidias, which stood between the Propylaea and the Parthenon on the Acropolis of Athens. Athena was the tutelary deity of Athens and the goddess of wisdom and warriors. Pheidias also sculpted two other figures of Athena on the Acropolis, the huge gold and ivory ("chryselephantine") cult image of Athena Parthenos in the Parthenon and the Lemnian Athena.

The designation Athena Promachos is not attested before a dedicatory inscription of the early fourth century CE; Pausanias (1.28.2) referred to it as "the great bronze Athena" on the Acropolis.

History 
The Athena Promachos was one of the earliest recorded works by Pheidias and was originally a well-known and famous Athenian landmark. According to the Greek traveler and geographer, Pausanias, the top of Athena's helmet as well as the tip of her spear could be seen by sailors and anyone approaching Athens from Attica, at Sounion. It originally stood between the Erechtheion and the Propylaea.

Erected around 456 BCE, the Athena Promachos was either to memorialize the Battle of Marathon or the Persian Wars which is possibly what the dedicatory inscription refers to; this inscription also mentions that the trophies won in the Persian War were once placed around the pedestal of the statue (Raubitschek, A. E., and Gorham P. Stevens). It took somewhere near nine years to construct. It is known that the statue was to be a 'thanks' after war but there are many disagreements about which war. It has also been suggested that the Athena Promachos may have been a cult statue. For a long time there was speculation if the Athena Promachos even existed, however most scholars now agree that it did as there is proof from Roman coins that depict it.

Surviving accounts for the creation process for the sculpture cover nine years, but the dates are not identifiable, because the names of officials are missing. The sculpture may have commemorated Kimon's defeat of the Persians at the Eurymedon in 467 or the peace of Kallias in approximately 450 or 449.

Made entirely of bronze, the Athena Promachos was spoken of as both 'the bronze Athena' and 'the great bronze Athena,' in ancient times. The term 'Promachos' meaning 'fighting before' or 'in front of' was not originally used when referring to the statue; this nickname came later, most notably being used by Zosimus.

Athena Promachos stood overlooking her city for approximately 1000 years, until shortly after 465 CE, when the sculpture was transported to Constantinople (capital of the Eastern Roman Empire) as a trophy in the "Oval Forum", which became the last bastion and safe haven for many surviving Greek bronze sculptures under the protection of the Eastern Empire's Imperial court. Niketas Choniates documented a riot taking place in the Forum of Constantine in Constantinople in 1203 CE where a large, bronze, statue of Athena was destroyed by a "drunken crowd" which is now thought to have been the Athena Promachos. Of surviving models thought to represent the type, the two outstanding ones are the Athena Elgin, a small bronze statuette in the Metropolitan Museum of Art, who bears an owl in her outstretched hand (as among some coin types), and the Athena Medici torso in the Musée du Louvre, of which there are a number of replicas.

Iconography 

The engravings on the shield which Athena is holding were originally drafted by the great Greek painter, Parrhasius (painter) of Ephesus. Although he drafted them, the engravings were physically done by an engraver named Mys. The engravings were not done during the time the statue was being made but actually added after. A 'molding pit' from the fifth century BCE was found near the south side of the Acropolis and it is thought that the statue was made in a nearby workshop.

Niketas gives a vivid description of the Athena Parthenos:

Similar depictions 
 Athena Parthenos, another lost colossal statue that was originally located inside the Parthenon. Made by Phidias.
 Lemnian Athena, classical Greek statue also made by Phidias. 
 Varvakeion Athena, a 3rd-century Roman copy of the Athena Parthenos.

Coinage depictions 
The very first specific archaistic Athena Promachos coin image was depicted on coins that were issued by Alexander the Great in 326. One side of this coin depicts Heracles while the other side shows the god, Zeus, with Athena by his knee ready to fight with her spear in her right hand and a shield held in her left. Around ten years later, the Athena Promachos appears on coins issued by Ptolemy in Alexandria before taking the title of king around 315 BCE.

Attic coins from the second and third centuries CE show the only known images of Phidias' Athena Promachos. On one side is the depiction of the view of the Acropolis from the north. Between the Propylaia and the Erechtheion, there is large female statue of Athena facing towards the west. As these images place the statue of the Athena Promachos in this specific location, there is no doubt that it existed.

There is another group of provincial Roman coins that depict the bust of Athena alone. In this depiction she is wearing a Corinthian helmet with a "wave" of hair upon her forehead. These coins date from the first half of the second century CE to the second half of the third century CE and are considered to be the most common. Since more coinage depictions of Athena wearing a Corinthian helmet have been found as opposed to those that depict her with an Attic helmet, it is thought that the Corinthian were a more popular representation.

Notes

References 
 John Boardman and David Finn, The Parthenon and its Sculpture
 J. J. Pollitt, 2nd ed., 1990. The Art of Ancient Greece: Sources and Documents (Cambridge University Press)
 Jenifer Neils, ed., The Parthenon: From Antiquity to the Present
 The Temple of Athena Nike at the Acropolis: Bibliography of the temple and the Athena Promachos
 R.J.H.Jenkins, 1947. "The Bronze Athena at Byzantium", Journal of Hellenic Studies 67 pp 31–33.
 Roy George, "Athena Promachos (Pheidias)": interpreting documentation of a Roman coin. Reconstructions of urbanistic context.
 The pre-Phidian type of Athena Promachos, armed, striding forward, spear at the ready: votive bronze, ca 480 BCE (Archaeological Museum of Athens)

External links 
 

5th-century BC religious buildings and structures
Acropolis of Athens
Sculptures by Phidias
Promach
Battle of Marathon
Ancient Greek military art
Ancient Greek and Roman colossal statues
Sculptures of Athena